The Little Magalloway River is a  river in northwestern Maine and northern New Hampshire in the United States. It is a tributary of the Magalloway River, located in the Androscoggin River watershed of Maine and New Hampshire.

The river rises in New Hampshire, just west of the state line, on the southern slopes of  Rump Mountain. The river flows southeast, quickly entering the state of Maine, where it ends at Aziscohos Lake on the Magalloway River. The entire watershed is forested and subject to logging.

See also

List of rivers of New Hampshire
List of rivers of Maine

References

Tributaries of the Kennebec River
Rivers of Maine
Rivers of New Hampshire
Rivers of Coös County, New Hampshire
Rivers of Oxford County, Maine